Elektrogorsk is a town in Moscow Oblast, Russia, located  east from Moscow. Population:

History
Elektrogorsk was founded in 1912 due to the construction of the first big peat-fired thermal power station in Russia, which would be called Elektroperedacha ("", lit. "electric power transmission"). The settlement was named after the power station. In 1946, it was granted town status and renamed Elektrogorsk.

Administrative and municipal status
Within the administrative divisions framework, it is incorporated as Elektrogorsk Town Under Oblast Jurisdiction—an administrative unit with the status equal to that of the districts. As a municipal division, Elektrogorsk Town Under Oblast Jurisdiction is incorporated as Elektrogorsk Urban Okrug.

Notable residents 

Aleksandr Boloshev (1947–2010), basketball player 
Alexey Chesmin (born 1986), paralympic footballer

References

Notes

Sources

External links

Official website of Elektrogorsk 
Elektrogorsk Business Directory 

Cities and towns in Moscow Oblast